Scripps Building can mean:

 Old Scripps Building, in La Jolla, California
 Scripps Center, in Cincinnati, Ohio